Philipp Kenan Dünnwald-Turan (born 14 November 1995) is a German professional footballer who plays as a midfielder.

After progressing through the youth ranks of Fortuna Düsseldorf, SG Unterrath and Rot-Weiß Oberhausen, Dünnwald played for both MSV Duisburg II and TSG Sprockhövel before a move to England. In August 2017, he joined Bristol Rovers.

Career

MSV Duisburg II 
In July 2014, Dünnwald joined Oberliga Niederrhein side MSV Duisburg II. On 10 August, he made his debut in a 5–0 victory against Sportfreunde Baumberg. On 6 June 2015, he scored his first goal for the club in a 4–1 win over TV Jahn Hiesfeld on the final day of the season.

On 11 October, he opened the scoring in a 2–2 draw with SpVg Schonnebeck. He added his second goal of the season in a 4–1 win against Düsseldorf-West on 28 March.

TSG Sprockhövel 
In July 2016, he signed for Regionalliga West side TSG Sprockhövel. Dünnwald made his debut in a 2–2 draw with SC Verl on 9 August, and made a further three league appearances for the club. On 17 August, he assisted Hatim Bentaleb's goal in a 1–0 win against VfL Senden in the Westphalian Cup First Round.

Bristol Rovers 
In August 2017, Dünnwald joined EFL League One club Bristol Rovers. On 26 September, he made his debut after coming off the bench for 11 minutes in a 3–0 league defeat to Portsmouth. On 31 October, he replaced Tom Nichols in the 66th minute of a 3–1 EFL Trophy defeat to West Ham United Under-23s. 
On 2 February 2018, Dünnwald joined National League South side Weston-super-Mare on an initial one month loan. On 9 March, the loan was extended for another month. On 24 May 2018, Dunnwald was announced as one of nine players who had not been offered a new contract for the development squad.

Scunthorpe United
On 3 September 2020, Dünnwald-Turan returned to English football, joining League Two side Scunthorpe United on a two-year deal. Kenan struggled to make an impact and rarely played and, as a result, he was released at the end of the 2021–22 season.

Stockport County (loan)
On 11 September 2021, Dünnwald-Turan joined National League club Stockport County on a one-month loan deal. He made one appearance in his time at the club off of the bench in a 3–0 home defeat to Yeovil Town.

Career statistics

References

External links

Living people
1995 births
German people of Turkish descent
German footballers
Association football midfielders
Fortuna Düsseldorf players
Rot-Weiß Oberhausen players
Bristol Rovers F.C. players
1. FC Kaan-Marienborn players
TSG Sprockhövel players
MSV Duisburg II players
Weston-super-Mare A.F.C. players
Wuppertaler SV players
SC Fortuna Köln players
Bonner SC players
Scunthorpe United F.C. players
Stockport County F.C. players
Regionalliga players
Oberliga (football) players
English Football League players
National League (English football) players
Footballers from Düsseldorf
German expatriate footballers
German expatriate sportspeople in England
Expatriate footballers in England